Li Pei-jung (born 25 April 2000) is a Taiwanese footballer who plays as a defender for Taiwan Mulan Football League club Taichung Blue Whale and the Chinese Taipei women's national team.

International career
Li Pei-jung represented Chinese Taipei at the 2014 AFC U-14 Girls' Regional Championship. She capped at senior level during the 2019 EAFF E-1 Football Championship
(final round) and the 2020 AFC Women's Olympic Qualifying Tournament (third round).

References

2000 births
Living people
Women's association football defenders
Taiwanese women's footballers
Chinese Taipei women's international footballers
Taiwanese women's futsal players